This is a list of earthquakes in 1992. Only earthquakes of magnitude 6 or above are included, unless they result in damage or casualties, or are notable for some other reason.  All dates are listed according to UTC time.

By death toll

By magnitude

By month

January

February

March

References 

1992
1992
1992